Edward Arthur Dunn (8 August 1868 – 11 January 1955) was an eminent Anglican bishop in the mid-20th century.

Biography 
Born into an ecclesiastical family – his father was Andrew Hunter Dunn, sometime Bishop of Quebec – on 8 August 1868, he was educated at Marlborough and Pembroke College, Cambridge. Ordained in 1895 he was successively Curate then Rector of St Paul's Quebec, Professor of Pastoral Theology at  Bishop's University, Lennoxville and finally (before his elevation to the episcopate) Rural Dean of Gaspe. Appointed to the post of Bishop of British Honduras in 1916 he was later elected Archbishop of the West Indies. After retiring he continued to take an active part in the life of his adopted country until his death on 11 January 1955.

References

1868 births
People educated at Marlborough College
Alumni of Pembroke College, Cambridge
Academic staff of Bishop's University
Anglican bishops of Belize
Anglican archbishops of the West Indies
1955 deaths
British Honduras in World War II